Jansen José Moreira (10 July 1927 – 9 July 2010) was a Brazilian footballer who competed in the 1952 Summer Olympics.

References

1927 births
2010 deaths
Association football forwards
Brazilian footballers
Olympic footballers of Brazil
Footballers at the 1952 Summer Olympics
CR Vasco da Gama players